Matthew or Matt Blake may refer to:

Matthew Blake (rugby league) (born 1983), English rugby league player
Matthew Robert Blake (1876–1937), Canadian politician
Matt Blake (born 1985), American baseball coach
Matt Blake, character in Ambush at Cimarron Pass
Matthew Blake, music artist for NoCopyrightSounds